Udhampur Air Force Station  of the Indian Air Force (IAF) is located in Udhampur in Jammu and Kashmir, India.

History
It is home to No. 153 Helicopter Unit of the Indian Air Force. While assigned to the unit, Gunjan Saxena became the first female officer of the IAF to fly in the Kargil War.

Facilities
It has one runway with concrete surfaces: 18/36 measuring 9000 by 148 feet (2,743 x 45 m).

References

Indian Air Force bases
Transport in Udhampur
Udhampur